The Hazards of Love is an EP by Anne Briggs, released by Topic Records in 1963.

Track listing
All songs are traditional.
 "Lowlands" (Roud 681)
 "My Bonny Boy" (Roud 293)
 "Polly Vaughan" (Roud 166; Laws O36)
 "Rosemary Lane" (Roud 269; Laws K43)

Release history 
Topic re-issued the EP as a limited edition vinyl facsimile to celebrate Record Store Day in 2014.

References

1964 EPs
Anne Briggs albums
Topic Records EPs
albums recorded at Olympic Sound Studios